The 1999 Canada rugby union tour of Great Britain was a series of matches played in August 1999 in Great Britain by Canada national rugby union team to prepare the 1999 Rugby World Cup.

Results
'Scores and results list Canada's points tally first.

References
 

Canada
Canada national rugby union team tours
tour
tour
tour
Rugby union tours of England
Rugby union tours of Wales